The U-12 European Baseball Championship, formerly the European Juveniles Baseball Championship, is an annual under-12 international baseball tournament sanctioned and created by the Confederation of European Baseball (CEB).

Results

Medal table

See also
 European Baseball Championship
 European Junior Baseball Championship
 European Youth Baseball Championship

References

 
European championships
WBSC Europe competitions
European youth sports competitions